Sassoli is an Italian surname that may refer to
Dina Sassoli (1920–2008), Italian film actress 
Lorenzo Sassoli de Bianchi (born 1952), Italian businessman and philanthropist 
David Sassoli (1956–2022), president of the European parliament
Pietro Sassoli (1898–1946), Italian composer and conductor

Italian-language surnames